Malabon Church is a Roman Catholic church located in San Agustin, Malabon, Metro Manila, Philippines. The church's titular is Malabon's patron saint, Saint Bartholomew the Apostle whose feast day falls on every 24th day of August.

History
A former visita of Tondo, Malabon was founded on May 21, 1599. On May 17, 1614, it became an independent parish, with Padre Luis Gutierrez as vicar prior. When Padre Diego de Robles became prior of Malabon in 1621, he began the construction of the first stone church a year after.

The construction was gradual as additions were made by succeeding priests. The transept was added in 1835 under Padre Francisco Valencia. The two lateral aisles together with the media naranja dome were added when Padre Raimundo Cueto assumed the post of minister of Malabon in 1854. This was done in collaboration with architects Vina and Urquiza. In 1861, construction of the Parthenon-like facade and the twin towers began under the direction of Luciano Oliver and supervision of parish priest Padre Martin Ruiz.

During World War II, San Bartolome Church suffered heavy damages and restoration began only in 1951 under the secular priest Father Trinidad. In 1958, Father Reyes took on the task of repairing the dome, transept, main altar, and the belfry.

San Bartolome Church now has seven bells, two of which are dedicated to Santa Rita and one to San Bartolome. One bell has Father Guillermo Diaz's name inscribed on it. Father Diaz, OSA, was minister of Tambobong from 1881 to 1885.

In celebration of the church's 400th anniversary, the Philippine Postal Corporation issued a limited edition stamp designed by Victorino Serevo. The stamp measures 80mm by 30mm and bears the image of St. Bartholome alongside the old Malabon Church.

Architecture
San Bartolome Church's protruding triangular pediment, supported by the colonnade of the facade, bears Augustinian symbol and the year 1861. The facade features eight imposing ionic columns reminiscent of a Greco-Roman temple.

The main entrance to the church is a jubilee door decorated with wood carvings. Numerous paintings framed with gold leaf line the church ceiling.

A simple yet elegant retablo can be found in the sanctuary where the image of Saint Bartholomew the Apostle is surrounded by the image of the Blessed Virgin Mary above, the tabernacle below, and St. Augustine and St. Nicholas de Tolentine on both sides.

The writer I.V. Mallari, a native of Malabon, writes that the church is "one of the most beautiful examples of ecclesiastical architecture that Spain has left this country."'

Gallery

References

Roman Catholic churches in Metro Manila
Buildings and structures in Malabon